Wordle is a web-based word game created and developed by Welsh software engineer Josh Wardle. It was bought by the New York Times Company in 2022 who has since maintained and published it. Players have six attempts to guess a five-letter word, with feedback given for each guess in the form of colored tiles indicating when letters match or occupy the correct position. The mechanics are nearly identical to the 1955 pen-and-paper game Jotto and the television game show franchise Lingo. Wordle has a single daily solution, with all players attempting to guess the same word.

Wardle created the game for himself and his partner to play, eventually making it public in October 2021. The game gained popularity in December 2021 after Wardle added the ability for players to copy their daily results as emoji squares, which were widely shared on Twitter. Many clones and variations of the game were also created, as were versions in languages besides English. The game was purchased by The New York Times Company in January 2022 for an undisclosed seven-figure sum, with plans to keep it free for all players; it was moved to the company's website in February 2022.

Gameplay

Every day, a five-letter word is chosen which players aim to guess within six tries. After every guess, each letter is marked as either green, yellow or gray: green indicates that letter is correct and in the correct position, yellow means it is in the answer but not in the right position, while gray indicates it is not in the answer at all. Multiple instances of the same letter in a guess, such as the "o"s in "robot", will be colored green or yellow only if the letter also appears multiple times in the answer; otherwise, excess repeating letters will be colored gray. The game has a "hard mode" option, which requires players to include letters marked as green and yellow in subsequent guesses. The daily word is the same for everyone. The game also has a dark theme as well as a high-contrast theme for colorblind accessibility, which changes the color scheme from green and yellow to orange and blue.

Conceptually and stylistically, the game is similar to the 1955 pen-and-paper game Jotto and to the game show franchise Lingo. The gameplay is also similar to the two-player board game Mastermind—which had a word-guessing variant Word Mastermind—and the game Bulls and Cows, with the exception that Wordle confirms the specific letters that are correct.

Each daily game uses a word from a randomly ordered list of 2,309 words (out of the approximate 13,000 five-letter words in the English language). The smaller word list was chosen by Wardle's wife, who categorized the five-letter words into those she knew, those she did not know, and those she might have known. Wordle uses American spelling, despite the developer being from Wales and using a UK domain name for the game; he is a long-time resident of Brooklyn, New York. Players outside the US have complained that this spelling convention gives American players an unfair advantage, for example in the case of the solution "favor".

According to data collected by The New York Times, the most common first guesses are "adieu", "audio", "stare", "raise", and "arise". Computer algorithms can solve the puzzle with 100% accuracy within 5 of the 6 allowed guesses.

History

Early development
Wardle created the prototype of Wordle in 2013, inspired by the color-matching game Mastermind. The prototype allowed players to play puzzles consecutively, and its wordlist was unfiltered. At first the game used all 13,000 possible five letter words in the English language, but he found that his partner Palak Shah had difficulty recognizing some of the less common words and made the guessing as haphazard as it was in Mastermind. He then used Shah as a simple filter to trim down the word list to around 2,000 words that were more recognizable – roughly five years of puzzles on a daily basis. After finishing the prototype around 2014, Wardle lost interest and set the prototype aside.

In the meantime, Wardle created the two online social experiments The Button and Place while working for Reddit. When the COVID-19 pandemic struck, he and his partner "got really into" The New York Times Spelling Bee and daily crossword puzzle. Wardle recalled his Wordle prototype and was inspired by two elements from Spelling Bee to flesh out the prototype further: the simple-to-use website design for the puzzle, and the limitation of one puzzle per day. By January 2021, Wardle had published Wordle on the web, mostly shared with himself and his partner. He had named it Wordle as a pun on his surname.

Rise in popularity
Later he shared it with his relatives, where it "rapidly became an obsession" with them. Over the next few months, he continued to share the Wordle website with other close friends, leading to the viral spread of attention to the puzzle by mid-October 2021. In one case, he found that it had become popular with a group of friends in New Zealand, where they had created the emoji-style display of the guesses which they shared with friends, which inspired Wardle to incorporate the feature into the game. After he had added this feature, the game became a viral phenomenon on Twitter in late December 2021. A Gale-published article even claims that "Wordle is less about winning and more about the friends we make along the way" due to the new ease of sharing.

Over 300,000 people played Wordle on January 2, 2022, up from 90 players on November 1, 2021, a figure that rose to over 2 million a week later. Between January 1 and 13, 1.2 million Wordle results were shared on Twitter. Several media outlets, including CNET and The Indian Express, attributed the game's popularity to the dailiness of the puzzles. Wardle suggested that having one puzzle per day creates a sense of scarcity, leaving players wanting more; he also noted that it encourages players to spend only three minutes on the game each day. He also noted some subtler details about the game, such as the game's keyboard changing to reflect the game state, as reasons for players' enjoyment. He had said that he has no intention to monetize the game and "It's not trying to do anything shady with your data or your eyeballs ... It's just a game that's fun." In an interview on BBC Radio 4's Today, Wardle stated that he does not know each day's word so he can still enjoy playing the game himself.

Separately, an entirely different game called Wordle! by Steven Cravotta, which had been released on the App Store five years prior to Wardle's Wordle, saw a boost in downloads and purchases from people who thought it was Wardle's game; according to Cravotta, between January 5 and 12, 2022, his game was downloaded over 200,000 times. Cravotta was glad to see his game's resurgence, though recognized purchasers were likely buying it thinking it was Wardle's Wordle. In collaboration with Wardle, he donated  from revenues to Boost in Oakland, California, a charity providing tutoring to Oakland schoolchildren.

Google Search created an Easter egg when one searches for "Wordle", with the site's logo becoming an animated game of Wordle to find the word "Google". To prevent play from being spoiled, Twitter took action to block an auto-reply bot that replied to any Wordle result post with the next day's word.

Acquisition by the New York Times Company
On January 31, 2022, the New York Times Company, the parent company of The New York Times, acquired Wordle from Wardle for an "undisclosed price in the low-seven figures." According to Wardle, the sudden attention he and his partner had gotten over the previous few months had made them uncomfortable, and also did not feel like spending the effort to fight against clones of Wordle that were appearing. Wardle said that "It felt really complicated to me, really unpleasant", and that being able to sell the rights to Wordle made it easy "to walk away from all of that." The Times intended to add the game to its mobile app alongside its crossword puzzles and Spelling Bee, seeking to bring in digital subscribers up to 10 million by 2025. The Times stated the game would initially remain free to new and existing users and that no changes would be made to its gameplay. Fans expressed worries that the acquisition meant the game would eventually be put behind a paywall. As the game operates entirely using client-side Javascript code run in the browser, some players have downloaded the webpage for offline use due to fears that the New York Times Company would modify the game undesirably.

On February 10, the game was officially moved to The New York Times website, with statistics carrying over; however, some players reported that their daily streaks reset after the switch. As part of the move, the Times eliminated some possible word guesses that they felt were insensitive or offensive terms such as "slave" and "lynch" as to "keep the puzzle accessible to more people", as well as eliminated some of the British spelling variants such as "fibre" in the solutions. The Times had also changed planned words in response to current events as to keep Wordle separate from the news. In May 2022, the solution word "fetus" was removed following the leaked draft decision in abortion-related United States Supreme Court case, Dobbs v. Jackson Women's Health Organization, to keep the game separate from the news. As of July 2022, a total of six words have been removed from the original 2,315 Wordle answers. Because of these deletions, the Times version of Wordle is now out of synchronization with cached or saved versions of Wordle, making it difficult for players of the two versions to compare their solution scores. By August 24, 2022, the New York Times Crossword app was updated to include Wordle, with player progression still synced between mobile and desktop versions.

On April 7, WordleBot was launched by the New York Times to give players information about how they completed their Wordle on that day, giving a luck and skill rating. Some users felt that the WordleBot responses became patronizing and insulting as the analysis of a player's completed puzzle progressed.

According to the Times quarterly earnings report ending on March 31, 2022, the acquisition of Wordle brought "tens of millions" of new players to the Times puzzle site and app, many of whom continued to play the other puzzles offered by the Times. In November 2022, the Times employed a dedicated editor, Tracy Bennett, to select the word of the day from a curated list. 
Speaking in January 2023 to Today she explained that the words are initially selected by a random system but she then checks each word for suitability. She eliminates those "if there are any, like, secondary meanings that are maybe either profane or derogatory", and avoids those which are difficult to find because they have four letters in common with many other words, such as "found" where there are eight options for the first letter.  "Fetus" was removed, before her appointment, at a time when abortion was in the news, and she checks "to see if there’s anything that would make one of those words feel more hurtful or insensitive than normal." The words causing most complaints, apart from those with too many options such as "found", had been unfamiliar terms: "parer", "Rupee" and the US-specific "condo". 

Wordle was the top Google search term globally and by American users in 2022. Because of the popularity of Wordle, Google searches from players looking to find out the definition of Wordle answers affected top Google search trends. Seven of the top 10 searched-for word definitions in 2022 were Wordle answers including cacao, homer, canny, foray, trove, saute and tacit.

The New York Times and Hasbro partnered to create Wordle: The Party Game, a physical board game variant for two to four players, where, each round, one player selects a secret word for other players to guess following Wordle rules. The game was released in October 2022. Polygon Charlie Hall described the physical game as a "cut-and-paste job" simply replicating the online game's mechanics without enhancing it for multiple players as a party game.

Adaptations and clones 

Following Wordle sudden rise in popularity at the start of 2022, a number of clones appeared. Some of these clones revised the formula in novel methods. Absurdle, created by British programmer qntm, is an adversarial version of Wordle where the target word changes with each guess, while still staying true to previously revealed hints. Other clones keep the mechanics of Wordle while changing the words the player needs to guess. These clones range from translations into other languages to guessing swear words in Sweardle and NFL players as in Weddle. There have also been a number of ports of Wordle to older hardware including GameBoy Wordle for the Nintendo Game Boy, Wordle DS for the Nintendo DS and a Nokia N-Gage port simply titled Wordle.

Other games used the "-le" suffix to indicate a connection with Wordle, even with significant gameplay differences. These include Semantle where players try to find a word on the basis of semantic similarity, Redactle where a Wikipedia article has most of its text hidden until the player selects words to reveal in order to identify it, and Waffle in which players have to organize letters into six different words in a five-by-five space. The game has also helped popularize a variety of non-word games, such as Worldle, in which players must identify a country or territory by its silhouette. If the player guesses wrong, instead of text-based hints they are given the direction and distance from the wrong location to the correct answer. Globle is similar in that you are guessing a country, but you are not given an outline. You simply make as many guesses as you need. As you guess closer to the correct country, the color of your guess becomes warmer.

The non-word games also include several math adaptations, such as Nerdle, Mathler, and Numble. In these games you must figure out the desired equation through the standard mechanics. Heardle, a Wordle-style game based on identifying songs, was acquired by Spotify for an undisclosed sum in July 2022. Warbl is just like Heardle with an added dimension of difficulty--the songs are played backwards. 

Quordle, in which players tackle four word puzzles simultaneously, was purchased by Merriam-Webster in January 2023 for an undisclosed sum, and relocated to be accessed from the dictionary-maker's website. While the most popular, Quordle isn't the only version of the game that changes how many words you must guess. There's also Dordle, Trordle, Hexordle, Octordle, Decordle, Sedecordle, Duotrigordle, Sexaginta, and Kilordle. In these games you must guess two, three, six, eight, ten, sixteen, thirty-two, sixty-four, or a thousand words, respectively. Polydle lets you choose anywhere from 1-2,000 words. 

A number of ad-supported Wordle clones appeared on Apple's App Store in early January 2022, but did little to alter the formula, even using the game's name. Users continued to seek out other Wordle clones on the App Store, and by the end of January 11, nearly all of the clones had been removed from the store. The New York Times filed an application to register a trademark for Wordle shortly after acquiring it to help protect the intellectual property.

Languages 
Shortly after gaining viral popularity among English-speaking users in January 2022, Wordle was adapted into other languages. An open-source version of the basic Wordle game was created by Hannah Park, and modified by linguist Aiden Pine to handle a larger array of character sets, making it amenable to a larger set of languages. Pine also has a free step-by-step blog explaining how to created your own Wordle. By the start of February 2022, at least 350 different variants of Wordle had been documented on the website "Wordles of the World". These include at least 91 versions based on real languages, including historical and regional dialects of some languages, and indigenous languages, and including uses of the Wordle formula for languages without alphabetic writing systems, such as Chinese chengyu and American sign language, and for fictional languages such as Klingon.

Languages that Wordle has been adapted into include:

Arabic
Armenian and Western Armenian
Basque
Belarusian
Bengali
Bulgarian
Cantonese
Catalan
Chinese
Croatian
Cypriot
Czech
Danish
Dutch
 Esperanto
Filipino
Finnish
French
Galician
German
Gitxsan
Greek
Hawaiian
Hebrew
Hungarian
Icelandic
Indonesian
Iñupiaq
Irish
Italian
Japanese
Kannada
Malaysian
Māori
Marathi
Norwegian
Occitan
Old Norse
 Polish
Portuguese
Romanian
Russian
Saanich
Serbian
Singlish
Slovenian
Spanish
Swedish
Tamil
Turkish
Ukrainian
Urdu
Uzbek
Welsh
Yiddish
There are also variants such as Cankuckle (Canada) or Wordawazzle (Australia), where the words must have some relationship with their country!

References

External links 

 
 "Wordles of the World" – List of Wordle variants and language adaptations

2021 video games
2020s fads and trends
Browser games
The New York Times
Video games developed in the United States
Word puzzle video games